Bohdan Dariiovych Sehin (born 1976, in Borshchiv) is a Ukrainian composer, and organizer of music programs.

Biography
He was born in 1976, in Borshchiv, Ternopil Oblast. In 1999, he graduated from the Lviv Conservatory (class of Prof. M. Skoryk). The composer's music is constantly performed in Ukraine and abroad. He has been part of musical collaborations with the Polish Institute in Kyiv, the Goethe-Institut, and the Austrian Cultural Forum. Simultaneously, in 2012, Bohdan Sehin began working as Commercial Director for the Development of Contemporary Music of the Lviv Regional Philharmonic and Executive Director of the International Festival of Contemporary Music "Contrasts."

Accomplishments
Laureate of the Prize named after L. Revutsky (2004).
Two-time participant in the scholarship program of the Minister of Culture and National Heritage of Poland "Gaude Polonia"
Fellow of the Warsaw Autumn Friends Foundation (2003). 
Received grant from the Gulliver Connect program (2008).
Received grant from the President of Ukraine (implemented in 2008–2010).
Winner of several composition competitions in Ukraine.
Member of the National Union of Composers of Ukraine.

Musical program organizer
Contrasts, 1998 to 2006, Lviv
Velvet Curtain, 2006, Lviv
Kyiv Music Fest, 2009, Kyiv
International Youth Music Forum 2009 and 2011–2012, Kyiv
Ensemble Nostri Temporis, 2009–present
Kyiv International Master Classes of New Music COURSE, 2012–present
Ukrainian Biennale of New Music, March 2013, Kyiv and Lviv

See also
Kontrasty
Ensemble Nostri Temporis
Academic Symphony Orchestra of the Lviv Philharmonic

References

External links
www.dw.com
pen.org.ua
day.kyiv.ua
Academic Studies Press

1976 births
Ukrainian composers
Living people
21st-century classical composers